The Municipal Art Society of New York (MAS) is a non-profit membership organization for preservation in New York City, which aims to encourage thoughtful planning and urban design and inclusive neighborhoods across the city.

The organization was founded in 1893. In January 2010, MAS relocated from its longtime home in the historic Villard Houses on 457 Madison Avenue to Steinway Hall on West 57th Street (across the street and east of Carnegie Hall). In July 2014, MAS moved into the Look Building at 488 Madison Avenue, across the street from its former Villard home.

History

MAS's advocacy efforts have shaped the city a great deal since its inception in 1893. Some of their early accomplishments include passage of the city's first zoning laws, contributing input to the planning of the city's subway line, and the commissioning of public art throughout the city.

By the 1950s, scores of notable Manhattan buildings were lost to redevelopment around the city, and the mission of MAS broadened to include historical preservation. In 1956, the Society successfully lobbied for the passage of the Bard Law, which for the first time allowed cities to take aesthetics, history, and cultural associations into account for zoning laws. The law, named after longtime MAS board member and chief advocate, Albert S. Bard, provided a legal foundation for the New York City Landmarks Law, enacted in 1965.

In 1965, public outrage over the destruction of Pennsylvania Station and the Brokaw Mansion helped fuel the Society's mission towards preservation. With like-minded groups, they finally succeeded in establishing New York's Landmarks Preservation Commission, and New York's Landmarks Law.

In 2001, after the demise of Trans World Airlines, the original Trans World Flight Center, completed in 1962 and designed by Eero Saarinen, fell into disuse. During this period, the Municipal Art Society succeeded in 2004 in nominating the facility to the National Trust for Historic Preservation’s list of the 11 Most Endangered Places.

In June 2007, MAS released with the Metropolitan Waterfront Alliance a new documentary about the future of the New York waterfront titled City of Water. In September 2007, the Society opened a major exhibition about Jane Jacobs sponsored by the Rockefeller Foundation.

Urban Center
The Municipal Art Society operates the Urban Center, a gallery on Madison Avenue. The gallery, founded in 1980, serves to champion the fields of urban planning and design in New York, and is also the site of MAS' community development workshops, seminars, lectures, and other educational programs. The Urban Center also includes a book store which specializes in architecture, urban planning, urban design, and environmental studies.

The Urban Center was located in Villard Houses from 1980 to 2010 where upon it moved to West 57th Street.

See also
 New York City arts organizations

References

External links
 

Urban planning organizations
Arts organizations based in New York City
Art societies
Historic preservation organizations in the United States
Organizations established in 1893
1893 establishments in New York (state)
Urban planning in New York City